Tatiana Dyková, née Vilhelmová (born July 13, 1978 in Prague, Czechoslovakia) is a Czech film and stage actress. She made her professional debut in Indian Summer (1995), directed by Saša Gedeon, for which she received her first nomination for the Czech Lion. She has been nominated seven times for the award, winning once for her performance in Bohdan Sláma's Something Like Happiness (2005). She has received other international awards including a Cottbus Film Festival Award, a Buenos Aires International Festival of Independent Cinema Award, a Golden Nymph Award, a Sochi International Film Festival Award and a Shooting Stars Award.

Biography
She is 5 ft 3 in tall. During her childhood she took lessons in ballet for 9 years, and was a member of Kühn's Children Choir. She left Prague Conservatory at 16 before finishing her studies, to start her acting career. She is a regular member of the Dejvice Theatre, run by the City of Prague.

She has two sons, František and Cyril, with her former husband Petr Čechák, and another son, Alois, with her second husband Vojtěch Dyk.

She won the third season of the Czech reality competition Tvoje tvář má známý hlas. She provided the voice of Elastigirl in the Czech-language dub of The Incredibles franchise and Collette in the Czech-language dub of Ratatouille.

Awards

Notes
A  The award shared with co-star Anna Geislerová for her role of Anna in the same movie by Saša Gedeon.
B  The award shared with Eszter Nagy-Kálózy for her role of Katalin in Smoldering Cigarette (2001) directed by Péter Bacsó.

References

External links
 

1978 births
Living people
Czech film actresses
Czech stage actresses
Czech television actresses
Actresses from Prague
21st-century Czech actresses
Czech Lion Awards winners